Alan Frei (born 27 March 1982) is a Swiss entrepreneur and economist known for his minimalist lifestyle. After receiving a bachelor's degree in finance from the University of Zurich (UZH), he founded several companies, including Nachhilfeportal.de and the e-commerce shop Amorana. He founded the start-up Center at the University of Zurich start-up center. In 2015, he began to receive press attention for his radically minimalist lifestyle, having reduced his possessions to around 80 items.

Minimalism
In 2014, inspired by minimalists such as Andrew Hyde and so-called "homeless billionaire" Nicolas Berggruen, Frei moved unneeded possessions to bags in his basement.

Frei proceeded to give away his possessions and he reduced his possessions to around 80 items.

Frei let go of his apartment and its furniture in October 2020. He travels around the world with his luggage including two pairs of sneakers, a toothbrush, a watch, some underwear, and sunglasses. He stays in hotels and eats at restaurants. He carries a foldable smartphone, a foldable wireless keyboard, and a wireless mouse for work.

References

Notes

External links
AlanFrei.com
Interviews on Schweizer Radio und Fernsehen: 
"Alan Frei: «Der grösste Gewinn ist die Freiheit»"
"Alan Frei: «Meine Freunde sind keine Minimalisten»" 

Swiss businesspeople
Living people
1982 births
University of Zurich alumni
Academic staff of the University of Zurich
Place of birth missing (living people)